, also known as Yanagi Muneyoshi, was a Japanese art critic, philosopher, and founder of the mingei (folk craft) movement in Japan in the late 1920s and 1930s.

Personal life
Yanagi was born in 1889 to Yanagi Narayoshi, a hydrographer of the Imperial Navy and Katsuko.

His son, Sori Yanagi, was a renowned industrial designer.

Career 
In 1916, Yanagi made his first trip to Korea out of curiosity about Korean crafts. The trip led to the establishment of the Korean Folk Crafts Museum in 1924 and the coining of the term mingei by Yanagi, potters Hamada Shōji (1894–1978) and Kawai Kanjirō (1890–1966).

Following the March First Movement, Korea's independence movement in which thousands of Koreans died at the hands of the Japanese police and military, Yanagi wrote articles in 1919 and 1920, expressing sympathy for the Korean people and appreciation for Korean art.

In 1926, the Folk Art Movement was formally declared by Yanagi. He rescued lowly pots used by commoners in the Edo and Meiji periods that were disappearing in rapidly urbanizing Japan. In 1936, the Japanese Folk Crafts Museum (Nihon Mingeikan) was established.

He was also working together with Onta ware.

Mingei theory
Yanagi Sōetsu discovered beauty in everyday ordinary and utilitarian objects created by nameless and unknown craftsmen. According to Yanagi, utilitarian objects made by the common people are "beyond beauty and ugliness". Below are a few criteria of mingei art and crafts:

made by anonymous crafts people
produced by hand in quantity
inexpensive
used by the masses
functional in daily life
representative of the region in which it was produced.

Yanagi's book The Unknown Craftsman has become an influential work since its first release in English in 1972. It examines the Japanese way of viewing and appreciating art and beauty in everyday crafts that include pottery, lacquer, textiles, and woodwork.

Yanagi was editor of Kōgei ('Crafts'), the journal of the Japanese Folk Arts Association, issued between 1931 and 1951.

Legacy 
In 1984, Yanagi was posthumously awarded the Bogwan Order of Cultural Merit, the first to be awarded to a non-Korean.

Yanagi was a considerable influence over the likes of potter Bernard Leach, sculptor Isamu Noguchi, and architect Bruno Taut.

References

External links

 Nihon Mingeikan (Japanese Folk Crafts Museum)

20th-century Japanese philosophers
Japanese art collectors
Shirakaba-ha
University of Tokyo alumni
People from Tokyo
1889 births
1961 deaths
Mingei